Dallas is a small rural village in Moray, Scotland. It has a population of between 150 and 200.

Etymology
The name Dallas was first recorded in 1226 as Dolays Mychel, and may be of Pictish origin. It is likely to involve the element dol, meaning "water haugh, meadow". The second element may be equivalent to the Brittonic gwas meaning "an abode".

Community
Dallas is known locally as having a good community spirit. It holds a village gala every July in which local girls are picked to be the Gala Queen and her attendants. The village will hold events daily including a games day which involves a race through the village in wheelbarrows or prams followed by "It's a knockout"-style team games. The gala is a bigger event than might be expected for such a small village, and attracts many visitors from surrounding areas.

Features
There is a lot of forestry in this region. The gardens of Dallas Lodge are often open to the public.

The Church of St Michael in the village dates from 1793, but is built on the site of an earlier church known from records to have been in existence in 1226.  Located in the churchyard is the Market Cross (also known as St Michael's Cross), possibly dating from the 15th century.

Notable person
William Anderson VC (November 1885 – 13 March 1915), a World War I recipient of the Victoria Cross, was born in Dallas.

Dallas Castle

Dallas Castle is barely standing, with only one small wall remaining. Tradition says it was used by the Wolf of Badenoch as a storehouse.

Education
Secondary students are in the catchment zone of Forres Academy in Forres.

References

External links

Dallas website
Gazetteer of Scotland: Dallas
Dallas Church

Villages in Moray